Pentathemis is a genus of dragonfly in the family Corduliidae. Pentathemis membranulata is the only known species of this genus, which is found in northern Australia.

Species
The genus contains only one species:
Pentathemis membranulata

See also
 List of Odonata species of Australia

References

Corduliidae
Anisoptera genera
Monotypic Odonata genera
Odonata of Australia
Endemic fauna of Australia
Taxa named by Ferdinand Karsch
Insects described in 1890